The Original Italian Pie is a chain of informal Italian-American restaurants. It was founded in 1995 by Hazem Abolrous. The restaurants employees consisted of Abolrous's friends and family. Their first restaurant was located on Bienville Street in New Orleans, Louisiana.  The menu consists of pizzas, salads, sandwiches, Pasta, Wraps and calzones.

The company began expanding through franchising in 1997 and by April 2010 had 13 locations in the Southeastern United States, but this had reduced to just six by November 2021.

See also
 List of Italian restaurants

References

External links
Official website

Food and drink companies of New Orleans
Privately held companies based in Louisiana
Economy of the Southeastern United States
Regional restaurant chains in the United States
Restaurants established in 1992
1992 establishments in Louisiana
Pizza franchises
Italian-American culture in Louisiana
Italian restaurants in the United States
Slidell, Louisiana